Aberdeen is an unincorporated community in Collingsworth County, Texas.

History
A post office was established at Aberdeen in 1889, and remained in operation until 1942. The community was named for the Earl of Aberdeen.

References

Unincorporated communities in Collingsworth County, Texas
Unincorporated communities in Texas
1889 establishments in Texas